Jeremy Dean (born 5 September 1985) was a New Zealand cricketer. He played in two List A and four Twenty20 matches for Wellington in 2009.

See also
 List of Wellington representative cricketers

References

External links
 

1985 births
Living people
New Zealand cricketers
Wellington cricketers
Cricketers from Wellington City